Aleš Neuwirth (born 4 January 1985) is a Czech former football player.

Neuwirth was a member of the squad of Baník Ostrava in the 2003–2004 season, when Baník won the league title. In 2011, he was transferred from Baník to FC Viktoria Plzeň and won the league title for the second time.

External links
 
 
 Profile at Baník Ostrava website 

Living people
1985 births
Czech footballers
Czech Republic youth international footballers
Czech Republic under-21 international footballers
Czech First League players
FC Baník Ostrava players
FK Drnovice players
SK Kladno players
FC Viktoria Plzeň players
FK Mladá Boleslav players
Association football defenders
Sportspeople from Ostrava